The Houghton Micropolitan Statistical Area, as defined by the United States Census Bureau, is an area consisting of two counties in the Upper Peninsula of Michigan, specifically the Keweenaw Peninsula, anchored by the city of Houghton.

As of the 2020 census, the μSA had a population of 39,407.

Counties
Houghton
Keweenaw

Cities, villages, and townships

Cities
Hancock
Houghton (Principal city)

Villages
Ahmeek
Calumet
Copper City
Lake Linden
Laurium
South Range

Townships

Unincorporated places
Atlantic Mine
Copper Harbor
Dakota Heights
Dodgeville
Dollar Bay
Dreamland
Eagle River
Franklin Mine
Hubbell – census-designated place
Hurontown
Jacobsville
Lac La Belle
Ripley
Senter

Demographics
As of the census of 2000, there were 38,317 people, 14,791 households, and 8,741 families residing within the μSA. The racial makeup of the μSA was 95.49% White, 1.10% African American, 0.51% Native American, 1.69% Asian, 0.02% Pacific Islander, 0.17% from other races, and 1.02% from two or more races. Hispanic or Latino of any race were 0.70% of the population.

The median income for a household in the μSA was $28,479, and the median income for a family was $37,697. Males had a median income of $28,683 versus $22,068 for females. The per capita income for the μSA was $15,924.

See also
Michigan census statistical areas
List of cities, villages, and townships in Michigan

References

 
Geography of Houghton County, Michigan
Geography of Keweenaw County, Michigan
Houghton, Michigan